Klasik TV  is a Croatian 24-hour film channel that was launched by Televizija Classicum d.o.o. in 2010. The channel broadcasts Yugoslav films and is available in Croatia, Bosnia and Herzegovina, Montenegro, North Macedonia, Serbia and Slovenia.

References

External links

Television channels and stations established in 2010
Television channels in Croatia
Television channels in North Macedonia
2010 establishments in Croatia
Movie channels